Kevin Reese Coffman (born January 19, 1965) is a former pitcher in the MLB, where he played three seasons. He played with the Atlanta Braves from 1987 to 1988, where he went 2–6 with a 5.46 Earned Run Average. He played in the MLB again in 1990, this time for the Chicago Cubs.  He went 0–2 with an 11.29 Earned Run Average, and did not play another year.

External links

1965 births
Living people
Atlanta Braves players
Chicago Cubs players
Major League Baseball pitchers
Baseball players from Austin, Texas
Gulf Coast Braves players
Pulaski Braves players
Anderson Braves players
Sumter Braves players
Durham Bulls players
Greenville Braves players
Richmond Braves players
Winston-Salem Spirits players
Charlotte Knights players
Iowa Cubs players
Jackson Generals (Texas League) players
Arizona League Mariners players
Jacksonville Suns players
Rio Grande Valley White Wings players